Choreutis turilega is a species of moth of the family Choreutidae. It is found in Mauritius.

References

Choreutis
Moths of Mauritius
Endemic fauna of Mauritius
Moths described in 1924